Najas ancistrocarpa is a species of aquatic plant in the Hydrocharitaceae family. It grows in fresh water ponds and is a native to Japan (Honshu) and to parts of China (Fujian, Hubei, Jiangxi, Taiwan, Zhejiang).

References

ancistrocarpa
Aquatic plants
Flora of Japan
Flora of Zhejiang
Flora of Jiangxi
Flora of Hubei
Flora of Fujian
Flora of China
Plants described in 1870
Taxa named by Alexander Braun
Taxa named by Paul Wilhelm Magnus